Oleg Strizhakov (born 18 July 1963 in Tbilisi, Georgian SSR) is a retired Russian long-distance runner.

He won the silver medal in 10,000 metres at the 1994 Goodwill Games and finished thirteenth in the marathon race at the 1995 World Championships.

International competitions

References

sports-reference

1963 births
Living people
Sportspeople from Tbilisi
Russian male long-distance runners
Soviet male long-distance runners
Soviet male marathon runners
Russian male marathon runners
Male marathon runners from Georgia (country)
Male long-distance runners from Georgia (country)
Olympic male long-distance runners
Olympic male marathon runners
Olympic athletes of Russia
Olympic athletes of the Unified Team
Athletes (track and field) at the 1992 Summer Olympics
Athletes (track and field) at the 1996 Summer Olympics
Goodwill Games medalists in athletics
Competitors at the 1994 Goodwill Games
World Athletics Championships athletes for Russia
Russian Athletics Championships winners